Stevie Brock is the self titled debut and only album by American singer Stevie Brock. It was released on June 10, 2003, through Wire Records.

Critical reception 
Stevie Brock received mainly negative reviews from critics. Johnny Loftus from AllMusic gave it one-and-a-half stars out of five, criticizing Brianna Lauren Fuentes's rap on "Shut Me Down" and saying Brock sounds like a little kid singing along to Justin Timberlake lyrics. However, he praised the songs "If U Be My Baby" and "All for Love," naming them the album's Track Picks.

Track listing 

2003 debut albums